Anosivelo is a rural municipality in Madagascar. It belongs to the district of Farafangana, which is a part of Atsimo-Atsinanana Region. The population of the commune was estimated to be approximately 17,000 in 2001 commune census.

Primary and junior level secondary education are available in town. The majority 95% of the population of the commune are farmers.  The most important crops are rice and coffee, while other important agricultural products are lychee and cassava. Services provide employment for 5% of the population.

Geography
The town is situated at 12 km North from Farafangana along the National road 12.

It is situated at the Manampatrana River.

References 

Populated places in Atsimo-Atsinanana